|}

The July Stakes is a Group 2 flat horse race in Great Britain open to two-year-old colts and geldings. It is run on the July Course at Newmarket over a distance of 6 furlongs (1,207 metres), and it is scheduled to take place each year in July.

History
The July Stakes is the oldest surviving event for two-year-olds in the British flat racing calendar. It was established in 1786, and it was originally open to horses of either gender. The conditions initially stipulated that those horses sired by Eclipse or Highflyer should carry an additional weight of three pounds.

The present system of race grading was introduced in 1971, and for a period the July Stakes was classed at Group 3 level. The event was restricted to colts and geldings in 1977, and it was promoted to Group 2 status in 2003.

The July Stakes is currently held on the opening day of Newmarket's three-day July Festival meeting. The equivalent race for fillies is the Duchess of Cambridge Stakes.

Records
Leading jockey (6 wins):
 George Fordham – Tolurno (1861), Robin Hood (1865), Lady Elizabeth (1867), Ecossais (1873), Levant (1875), Ruperra (1878)
 Sir Gordon Richards – Hilla (1934), High Sheriff (1944), Rivaz (1945), Masaka (1947), Diableretta (1949), Tamerlane (1954)

Leading trainer (7 wins):
 Frank Butters – Fairway (1927), Alishah (1933), Hilla (1934), Mirza II (1937), Rivaz (1945), Masaka (1947), Diableretta (1949)

Winners since 1979

Earlier winners

 1786: Bullfinch
 1787: Jubilator
 1788: Seagull
 1789: Ostrich
 1790: filly by Saltram
 1791: Trumpetta
 1792: Cymbeline
 1793: filly by Trumpator
 1794: colt by Volunteer
 1795: colt by Anvil
 1796: Emigrant
 1797: Young Spear
 1798: Vivaldi
 1799: Skyrocket
 1800: Flambeau
 1801: Julia
 1802: Duckling
 1803: Ringtail
 1804: Newmarket
 1805: Pantaloon
 1806: Little Sally
 1807: Susan
 1808: Spindle
 1809: Cambric
 1810: Joke
 1811: Cato
 1812: July
 1813: Vittoria
 1814: Minuet
 1815: Belvoirina
 1816: Merrymaker
 1817: Loo
 1818: Miracle
 1819: Caroline
 1820: Gustavus
 1821: The Stag
 1822: Palais Royal
 1823: Reformer
 1824: Red Gauntlet
 1825: Crusader
 1826: Tom Thumb
 1827: Scribe
 1828: Green Mantle
 1829: The Mummer
 1830: Zany
 1831: Beiram
 1832: Forester
 1833: Zulima
 1834: Kate Kearney
 1835: The Athenian
 1836: Armenia
 1837: Mecca
 1838: Bulwark
 1839: Crucifix
 1840: Yorkshire Lad
 1841: Chatham
 1842: Extempore
 1843: Orlando
 1844: Old England
 1845: Queen Anne
 1846: Miami
 1847: Iodine
 1848: The Flying Dutchman
 1849: Sweetheart
 1850: Grecian
 1851: Hobbie Noble
 1852: The Reiver
 1853: Marsyas
 1854: The Bonnie Morn
 1855: Spindle
 1856: Drumour
 1857: Gin
 1858: Cynricus
 1859: Buccaneer
 1860: Dictator
 1861: Tolurno
 1862: Saccharometer
 1863: Cambuscan
 1864: Liddington
 1865: Robin Hood
 1866: Achievement
 1867: Lady Elizabeth
 1868: Ryshworth
 1869: Sunshine
 1870: Hannah
 1871: Sir Amyas
 1872: Somerset
 1873: Ecossais
 1874: Camballo
 1875: Levant
 1876: Warren Hastings
 1877: Strathfleet
 1878: Ruperra
 1879: Mask
 1880: Bal Gal
 1881: Kermesse
 1882: Macheath
 1883: Queen Adelaide
 1884: Luminary
 1885: Kendal
 1886: Enterprise
 1887: Friar's Balsam
 1888: Donovan
 1889: Loup
 1890: Beauharnais
 1891: Flyaway
 1892: Milford
 1893: Speed
 1894: Kirkconnel
 1895: Labrador
 1896: Velasquez
 1897: Mousme
 1898: Desmond
 1899: Captain Kettle
 1900: Doricles / Veles 1
 1901: Sceptre
 1902: Hammerkop
 1903: Montem
 1904: Cicero
 1905: Gorgos
 1906: Traquair
 1907: Pearl of the Loch
 1908: Battleaxe
 1909: Prince Rupert
 1910: St Anton
 1911: White Star
 1912: Rock Flint
 1913: Ambassador
 1914: Roseland
 1915: Figaro
 1916: Grand Fleet
 1917: no race
 1918: Buchan
 1919: Sarchedon
 1920: Monarch
 1921: Lembach
 1922: Legality
 1923: Diophon
 1924: Runnymede
 1925: Apple Sammy
 1926: The Satrap
 1927: Fairway
 1928: Mr Jinks
 1929: Teacup
 1930: Four Course
 1931: Riot
 1932: Colorow
 1933: Alishah
 1934: Hilla
 1935: Daytona
 1936: Foray
 1937: Mirza II
 1938: Prometheus
 1939: colt by Colombo
 1940: no race
 1941: Ujiji
 1942–43: no race
 1944: High Sheriff 2
 1945: Rivaz
 1946: Miss Stripes
 1947: Masaka
 1948: Nimbus
 1949: Diableretta
 1950: Big Dipper
 1951: Bob Major
 1952: Empire Honey
 1953: Darius
 1954: Tamerlane
 1955: Edmundo
 1956: Earl Marshal
 1957: Abelia
 1958: Greek Sovereign
 1959: Sound Track
 1960: Favorita
 1961: Burning Thoughts
 1962: Romantic
 1963: Endless Honey
 1964: Ragtime
 1965: Sky Gipsy
 1966: Golden Horus
 1967: Lorenzaccio
 1968: Burglar
 1969: Huntercombe
 1970: Swing Easy
 1971: Deep Diver
 1972: Perdu
 1973: Dragonara Palace
 1974: Auction Ring
 1975: Super Cavalier
 1976: Sky Ship
 1977: Royal Harmony
 1978: Main Reef

1 The 1900 race was a dead-heat and has joint winners.2 The 1944 running took place at Windsor.

See also
 Horse racing in Great Britain
 List of British flat horse races

References
 Paris-Turf:
 Racing Post:
 galopp-sieger.de – July Stakes.
 ifhaonline.org – International Federation of Horseracing Authorities – July Stakes (2019).
 pedigreequery.com – July Stakes – Newmarket.
 

Flat races in Great Britain
Newmarket Racecourse
Flat horse races for two-year-olds
Recurring sporting events established in 1786
1786 establishments in Great Britain